This is a list of places on the Commonwealth Heritage List in Western Australia. The Commonwealth Heritage List is a heritage register which lists places of historic, cultural and natural heritage on Commonwealth land or in Commonwealth waters, or owned or managed by the Commonwealth Government. To be listed, a place has to meet one or more of the nine Commonwealth Heritage List criteria.

List

Currently listed places
Listed are all 19 places in Western Australia that are currently on the Commonwealth Heritage List in the state as of 2020:

Formerly listed places
Listed are all three places in Western Australia that were formerly on the Commonwealth Heritage List in the state as of 2020:

See also
 Commonwealth Heritage List in Queensland

References

 Commonwealth